Sarapaka is a census town in Bhadradri Kothagudem district in the Indian state of Telangana which is in the national highway 30. It is in Pinapaka assembly constituency and in Mahabubabad Loksabha Constituency.

Demographics
 India census, Sarapaka had a population of 16,973 but actual population is approximately 40,000+. Males constitute 51% of the population and females 49%. Sarapaka has an average literacy rate of 70%, higher than the national average of 59.5%: male literacy is 73%, and female literacy is 58%. In Sarapaka, 13% of the population is under 6 years of age.

Temples
Mutyalamma temple is the famous goddess which is called in Telugu as "Grama Devatha". Offerings are given to goddess in the form of "bali" along with Chakrapongali. There is a special utsav done during Dussehra and in sravana month.
Other temples are Sri Satyanarayana Temple, Vinayaka Temple, Shirdi Sai Baba Temple, Krishna Temple etc.

References

Cities and towns in Bhadradri Kothagudem district